Hideaki Hara (born 1 August 1956) is a Japanese former swimmer. He competed in three events at the 1976 Summer Olympics.

References

External links
 

1956 births
Living people
Japanese male butterfly swimmers
Olympic swimmers of Japan
Swimmers at the 1976 Summer Olympics
Sportspeople from Hiroshima
Asian Games medalists in swimming
Asian Games gold medalists for Japan
Asian Games silver medalists for Japan
Swimmers at the 1974 Asian Games
Medalists at the 1974 Asian Games
20th-century Japanese people